Whipped & Glazed is the second and final studio album by British duo Thumpers. It was released on 1 September 2017 under True Say! Recordings.

Track listing

References 

2017 albums
Thumpers albums